GBAS may refer to:
GBAS (gene)
Ground-Based Augmentation System, satellite navigation system